Stars are Burning is the forty-third album by Klaus Schulze. Taking into consideration the previously released multi-disc box sets (Silver Edition, Historic Edition, Jubilee Edition, Contemporary Works I, and Contemporary Works II), it could be viewed as Schulze's one hundred and fourth album. On the LP release of the album, the tracks on the second disc are omitted, and replaced by "Invisible Musik", a track previously released on the 2008 compilation Muting the Noise 01.

Track listing

Disc 1

Disc 2

References

Klaus Schulze live albums